Shahana Rahman Rani was a Bangladesh Nationalist Party politician and the former Member of the Bangladesh Parliament from a reserved seat for women.

Career
Rani was elected to parliament from reserved seat as a Bangladesh Nationalist Party candidate in 2005. She also served as the vice-president of Jatiyatabadi Mohila Dal. She died from different complications at a local hospital on 6 July 2022.

References

20th-century births
2022 deaths
Bangladesh Nationalist Party politicians
Women members of the Jatiya Sangsad
8th Jatiya Sangsad members
Year of birth missing
21st-century Bangladeshi women politicians